East Aston Common is an  biological Site of Special Scientific Interest east of Andover in Hampshire.

This site in the flood plain of the River Test is part of one of the finest chalk stream habitats in Britain. It has alluvial meadows with a rich variety of herbs, areas of tall fen and a wide and shallow stretch of the river. There are many wetland birds, such as  grasshopper warblers, water rails and reed bunting.

References

 
Sites of Special Scientific Interest in Hampshire